The  was a rural railway line in Fukushima Prefecture, Japan, which closed on 30 March 1968. It operated between Onahama-Sakaechō and Ena in Iwaki, Fukushima. The railway was operated by the Onahama Rinkō Railway.

Description
 Distance: 4.9 km / 3.0 mi.
 Gauge: 
 Double-track line: None
 Electrification: None

History
17 April 1916: The  (horse-drawn) opens between Onahama and Ena.
9 December 1936: The line closes.
12 January 1953: The line opens between Sakaechō and Ena. (Onahama - Sakaechō was opened by Onahama Rinkō Railway)
September 1965: The line is damaged by a typhoon.
15 February 1966: Operation ceases.
30 March 1968: The line closes.

Stations

See also
 List of railway lines in Japan

References
This article incorporates material from the corresponding article in the Japanese Wikipedia

External links
浪江森林鉄道～古の鉄道を訪ねて～(Namie Forest Railway -Visit Old Railways-) 

Rail transport in Fukushima Prefecture
Defunct railway companies of Japan
Railway lines opened in 1916
Railway lines closed in 1968
1067 mm gauge railways in Japan